Stephania is a genus of flowering plants in the family Menispermaceae.

Stephania may also refer to:

 220 Stephania, a main-belt asteroid
 Stephania (given name), a feminine given name of Greek origin

See also
 Stefania (disambiguation)
 Stepania (disambiguation)
 Stephanian (disambiguation)